The Triplets of Belleville is a 2003 animated comedy film written and directed by Sylvain Chomet. It was released as Belleville Rendez-vous in the United Kingdom. The film is Chomet's first feature film and was an international co-production among companies in France, Belgium, Canada and the United Kingdom.

The film features the voices of Lina Boudreault, Mari-Lou Gauthier, Michèle Caucheteux, Jean-Claude Donda, Michel Robin, and Monica Viegas. There is little dialogue; much of the narrative is conveyed through song and pantomime. It tells the story of Madame Souza, an elderly woman who goes on a quest to rescue her grandson Champion, a Tour de France cyclist, who has been kidnapped by the French mafia for gambling purposes and taken to the city of Belleville (an amalgam of Paris, New York City, Montreal and Quebec City). She is accompanied by Champion's loyal and obese hound, Bruno, and joined by the Triplets of Belleville, music hall singers from the 1930s, whom she meets in the city.

The film was highly praised by audiences and critics for its unique style of animation and has since gained a cult following. The film was nominated for two Academy Awards—Best Animated Feature and Best Original Song for "Belleville Rendez-vous". It was also screened out of competition (hors concours) at the 2003 Cannes Film Festival.

Plot
In France, Madame Souza raises her grandson Champion, a melancholy orphan. Both watch an old variety show on television featuring a trio of singers, the Triplets of Belleville (Rose, Violette, and Blanche). When the program is interrupted, Souza asks Champion if the "film" is finished. The listless Champion does not reply and instead changes the channel to a piano concert. Souza, upon noticing Champion's interest in the music, pulls out an old piano and tries to attract Champion's attention by playing a scale, but Champion remains indifferent. Souza deduces that Champion is lonely and buys him a dog, Bruno. Neither Bruno nor an electric train set succeed in lifting Champion's spirits.

While tidying Champion's room, Souza discovers a book filled with photos of cyclists. She decides to buy Champion a tricycle, which finally allows Champion to indulge in his passion. After a few years of training, Champion competes in the Tour de France, but finds himself left behind in his exhaustion, and he is kidnapped by a pair of mobsters, who take him and two other contestants across the Atlantic. Souza pursues Champion on a pedalo to Belleville.

Arriving in the United States, Souza finds herself penniless, but meets the elderly Triplets of Belleville, Rose, Violette and Blanche. The Triplets take Souza into their apartment, and after a peculiar dinner, they allow her to participate as a musician in one of their shows. During the show, Souza spots the mobsters who kidnapped Champion. With the help of the Triplets, Souza pursues the men and rescues her grandson after a Homeric chase. In a flashforward, an older Champion watches the TV again showing their adventure when they are leaving the city and imagines Souza asking once more if the film is finished. Champion turns to the empty couch seat next to him and says "It's over, grandma".

In a humorous post-credits scene, the boatman who rented Souza the pedalo is seen waiting expectantly for his vessel to return.

Reception
Metacritic, which assigns a normalized score, rated it 91/100 based on 35 reviews, indicating "universal acclaim".

Awards
The film was nominated for two Academy Awards: for Best Animated Feature, making it the first PG-13 animated film to be nominated in that category; and for Best Original Song (Benoît Charest and Sylvain Chomet for the song "Belleville Rendez-vous", sung by Matthieu Chedid in the original version). The film lost the Best Animated Feature award to Finding Nemo. It also won the César for Best Film Music, and as a co-production with Canada it won the Genie Award for Best Motion Picture and the BBC Four World Cinema Award in 2004.

See also
 List of animated feature films
 Arthouse animation
 Independent animation

References

External links
 
 
 
 
 

2003 films
2003 animated films
2003 comedy films
2003 directorial debut films
2000s French animated films
Belgian animated films
Belgian comedy films
Best Film Lumières Award winners
Best Picture Genie and Canadian Screen Award winners
British animated films
British comedy films
Canadian animated feature films
Canadian animated comedy films
Cultural depictions of Django Reinhardt
Cultural depictions of Fred Astaire
Cultural depictions of Josephine Baker
Cycling films
Fictional triplets
Films about old age
Films about pets
Films about sisters
Films about wine
Films directed by Sylvain Chomet
French animated films
French comedy films
2000s French-language films
Sony Pictures Classics animated films
French-language Belgian films
2000s American films
2000s Canadian films
2000s British films
French animated feature films